Hormuz Island (Jazireh-ye Hormoz), also spelled Hormoz, is an Iranian island in the Persian Gulf. It is sparsely inhabited, but some development has taken place since the late 20th century.

History

The earliest evidence for human presence on the island is several stone artifacts discovered at the eastern shorelines of the Island. A lithic scatter was found at a site called Chand-Derakht, which is an uplifted marine Pleistocene terrace. This site yielded a Middle Paleolithic lithic assemblage characterized by Levallois methods and dates back to more than 40,000 years ago.

The island, known as Organa to the ancient Greeks and as Jarun in the Islamic period, acquired the name of "Hormuz" from the important harbour town of Hormuz (Ormus) on the mainland 60 km away, which had been a centre of a minor principality on both sides of the strait. The principality paid tribute to the Mongol-ruled Ilkhanate and was an important source of income from maritime trade. The town's ruler decided to shift his residence to the island around 1300, in order to evade attacks by Mongolian and Turkish groups from the interior. The ruler later made peace with the Ilkhans.

A new town was built on the northern tip of Jarun island which was called New Hormuz for a number of years to distinguish it from the old town on the mainland until this fell into ruins. Slowly the name of the new town came to be used for the island as well.

As such, it was not an ideal location for the capital of a principality as all provisions including water had to be brought from the mainland. Its location, however, gave the island a degree of security which let it grow to be a major trading port for several centuries. As its competitors suffered from intermittent destruction, Hormuz remained a reliable and relatively safe harborage.

Hormuz was visited by Marco Polo, around 1290, while traveling by land, as described in his travelogue.

Ibn Battuta also visited the island and New Hormuz.

In 1505, King Manuel I of Portugal established a policy of expansion in Africa and Western Asia. During attempts to expand Portuguese influence into the Indian Ocean, the Portuguese duke Afonso de Albuquerque captured the island in 1507 and it was incorporated into the greater Portuguese Empire. The Portuguese constructed a fortress on the island to deter potential invaders, naming it the Fort of Our Lady of the Conception. The island became an emergency stopover point for Portuguese ships traveling to Goa, Gujarat, and nearby Kishm. The Ottomans laid siege to the island under the admiral and cartographer Piri Reis in 1552. In 1622, the island was captured from the Portuguese by a combined Anglo-Persian force at the behest of the English East India Company.

Shah Abbas I of Persia distrusted the local population and was not interested in maintaining the island as a trading centre or military post; instead he developed the nearby mainland port of Bandar Abbas. Hormuz went into decline. Many of its inhabitants seasonally moved to their fields and orchards around the old Hormuz on the mainland, only fishermen being in permanent residence. The island continued to export small quantities of rock salt and lumps of iron oxide which were used as ballast stones for sailing ships.

After a period of Omani administration in the 19th century, it remained a sparsely inhabited fishermen's island before experiencing some development in the later years of the 20th century.

Geography and geology
It is covered by sedimentary rock and layers of volcanic material on its surface. Due to a lack of precipitation, the soil and water are salty. Specialists have helped cultivar white mangrove or Hara trees to grow in the climate. Due to the lack of fresh water, Iranian engineers have constructed a water pipeline from the mainland. There are many beaches that go all around the island.

Reddish ochre on the island and its beaches, called Golak by natives, has been exploited for artistic and culinary purposes, and also attracts tourists. Degradation due to overuse of the ochre has resulted in actions by the Department of Environment to protect it.

The rocks show that, over thousands of years that the island of Hormuz gradually rose out of the water, eroded into different shapes. The geological age of the Hormuz island is about 600 million years, and its life out of the water is about 50 thousand years.

Attractions

Statues Valley
With a few hundred meters walk to the beach, in a way that silver sands attracts attention, rocks can be seen in many different forms, each is likened to an animal, a sheep's head, poultry and many different Dragons.

Red Beach
Hormuz Island has soil rich in red ferrious oxide soil, called “Gelack”. It is a valuable mineral for industrial purposes, and it used as a spice in local cuisine, such as sauces and jams.

The mountain being on the shoreline, makes the red beach and red sea waves an unusual sight. Visitors walking along the shore will encounter areas where sand glitters with metal compounds.

Mangrove forest
Hormuz island has a forest of mangrove trees. The waterways and wild birds with its pristine nature attracts many tourists. Sea Forest has trees that live in the saltwater tidal area. Sometime most of them submerge in the sea water, but continue to survive. Iran’s southern coast is known for its aridity and salty sea water. there is a grassy area, that grows without the need for fresh water. In a story this mythical plant is grown from Adam’s tears.

Dr. Nadalian Museum

The Museum of Dr Nadalian in Hormuz Island, also known as the Museum and Gallery of Ahmad Nadalian in Hormuz Island, shows the work of Ahmad Nadalian (born 1963), whose works have been shown in galleries internationally.  His environmental art projects include rock carvings, and not only his work, but also that of local indigenous women, bones of sea creatures are displayed in his museum, and dolls made of recycled materials.

The museum was created in March 2009 as the Paradise Art Centre, being renamed in 2012 to its current name. Also at this time, its entrance was redesigned with inspiration from local architecture.

Gallery

References

Sources
.الكوخردى ، محمد ، بن يوسف، (كُوخِرد حَاضِرَة اِسلامِيةَ عَلي ضِفافِ نَهر مِهران) الطبعة الثالثة ،دبى: سنة 199۷ للميلاد Mohammed Kookherdi (1997) Kookherd, an Islamic civil at Mehran river, third edition: Dubai
. کامله،القاسمی،  بنت شیخ عبدالله، (تاریخ لنجة)  مکتبة دبي للتوزیع، الامارات: الطبعة الثانية عام ۱۹۹۳ للمیلاد
 . الوحیدی الخنجی، حسین بن علی بن احمد،  «تاریخ لنجه» ، الطبعة الثانية دبی: دار الأمة للنشر والتوزیع، ۱۹۸۸ للمیلاد
. اطلس گیتاشناسی استان‌های ایران  Gitashenasi Province Atlas of Iran Atlas Gitashenasi Ostanhai Iran 
. دره مجسمه ها Statue Valley Hormuz Island 

Further readingSpeak the Wind'' (Mack, 2021; photographs by Hoda Afshar; essay by Michael Taussig) This work documents the landscapes and people of the islands of Hormuz Island, Qeshm, and Hengam, in the Persian Gulf off the south coast of Iran. Afshar got to know some of the people there, travelling there frequently over the years, and they told her about the history of the place. She said that "their narrations led the project", and she explores "the idea of being possessed by history, and in this context, the history of slavery and cruelty”.

External links

Hormuz, The Bloody Island of Iran The Globetrotting Detective.

 
Islands of Iran
Qeshm County
Landforms of Hormozgan Province
Tourist attractions in Hormozgan Province